Spondylo-ocular syndrome is a rare genetic disorder characterised by lesions in the eye and the spine.

Presentation

These can be divided into those affecting the eyes, spine and other areas:

Genetics

This syndrome is caused by inactivating mutations in the xylosyltransferase (XYLT2) gene. It is inherited in an autosomal recessive manner.

Diagnosis

Treatment

History

This syndrome was first described by Schmidt et al in consanginous Iraqi family in 2001.

References

External links 

Autosomal recessive disorders
Eye diseases
Vertebral column disorders
Syndromes